José Miguel Soza Hernández (born June 26, 1946 in Teno) is a Chilean award-winning theater, film and television actor. He has also worked as a theater director, dubbing actor and broadcaster. He belonged to the cast of the golden age of the television series by director Vicente Sabatini between 1995 and 2005.

Filmography

Films

Telenovelas

References

1946 births
Living people
Chilean male film actors
Chilean male television actors
People from Curicó Province
20th-century Chilean male actors
21st-century Chilean male actors